Heaven Razah is a solo album by rapper Hell Razah, released on September 28, 2010 through Nature Sounds Records. Razah is most famed as a member of Wu-Tang Clan affiliate groups Sunz of Man and Black Market Militia. The album features production from Dev 1, Rainmayqah, Jordan River Banks, Kevlaar 7, Ayatollah, Shroom, St. Peter, Blastah Beatz, Havoc and Wu-Tang affiliate producers Bronze Nazareth, Allah Mathematics and 4th Disciple. Album guests include Timbo King, R.A. the Rugged Man, Shabazz the Disciple and Darnell McClain.

Track listing

Album singles 

2010 albums
Hell Razah albums
Nature Sounds albums
Albums produced by Bronze Nazareth
Albums produced by Ayatollah